Devika Parikh (born November 3, 1966) is an American actress, best known for her recurring role as Bonnie in the NBC political drama series The West Wing from 1999 to 2003.

Life and career
Parikh  was born in Cambridge, Massachusetts and raised in Gaithersburg, Maryland. She is of Indian and Black American origin, born to an East Indian immigrant father from Mumbai and a Black American mother. She received a degree in broadcast journalism from Syracuse University.

Parikh has worked in television, advertisements, film, voice work and theatre. She has also performed sketch comedy/improvisation with groups at the Comedy Store, the Upfront Comedy Theatre and the Underground Improv.  She has had recurring roles on television shows such as NBC's drama series The West Wing; Fox's series 24; and Showtime drama series Resurrection Blvd. She has guest-starred on Criminal Minds, That's So Raven, The Parkers, Bones, Shameless and Grey's Anatomy. In 2022, Parikh was cast in her first series regular role, in the Oprah Winfrey Network prime time soap opera, The Kings of Napa.

Selected filmography

Film
 1997 How to Be a Player as Barbara
 1999 Judgment Day as Officer Rhonda Reese
 2000 Dancing in September as Cheryl Reed
 2003 S.W.A.T. as Jail Intake Reporter
 2005 Madagascar as News Reporter (voice)
 2009 Ice Age: Dawn of the Dinosaurs as Additional Voices
 2011 A Bag of Hammers as Interviewer 1
 2017 The Star as Additional Voices
 2018 Aquaman as Newscaster Morgan
 2018 Spider-Man: Into the Spider-Verse as Additional Voices

Television
1996 ‘’The Wayans Bros’’ as Dee's sister Natalie - 1 episode
 1999–2003 The West Wing as Bonnie – 41 episodes
 2001–2002 24 as Maureen Kingsley – 4 episodes
 2005 That's So Raven as Yolanda – 2 episodes
 2019 Grey's Anatomy as Nancy Klein – 3 episodes
 2020 General Hospital as Ms. Madigan – 2 episodes
 2022 The Kings of Napa as Melanie Pierce – 8 episodes

Video games
 2013 Grand Theft Auto V as The Local Population
 2019 Fallout 76: Wild Appalachia DLC as Janelle Priblo / Mary Tinley / Brother of Steel Dispatcher 
 2019 Rage 2 as Goon Shielder / Gunbarrel Civilian / Lagooney Civilian / Oasis Civilian
 2020 The Walking Dead: Saints & Sinners as Radio Announcer / Additional Voices

References

External links
 

Syracuse University alumni
American actresses of Indian descent
People from Gaithersburg, Maryland
1966 births
Living people
American television actresses
African-American actresses
21st-century African-American people
20th-century African-American people
20th-century American actresses
21st-century American actresses
20th-century African-American women
21st-century African-American women